Gang Chun-won (born 5 November 1940) is a South Korean boxer. He competed in the men's bantamweight event at the 1960 Summer Olympics.

References

1940 births
Living people
South Korean male boxers
Olympic boxers of South Korea
Boxers at the 1960 Summer Olympics
Sportspeople from Seoul
Bantamweight boxers